Jon Urzelai Inza (born 1 March 1977) is a Spanish retired footballer who played as a defender.

Club career
Urzelai was born in Oñati, Gipuzkoa. He amassed Segunda División totals of 185 matches and two goals over seven seasons, in representation of SD Eibar (four years, two spells), Real Murcia (two) and UD Vecindario (one).

In a senior career which spanned 16 years, Urzelai played lower league football with Real Sociedad B, Novelda CF, Barakaldo CF and Eibar.

References

External links

1977 births
Living people
Spanish footballers
Footballers from the Basque Country (autonomous community)
Association football defenders
Segunda División players
Segunda División B players
Tercera División players
Real Sociedad B footballers
Novelda CF players
Barakaldo CF footballers
SD Eibar footballers
Real Murcia players
UD Vecindario players
Basque Country international footballers